The flag of the Podlaskie Voivodeship, Poland is a rectangle divided into four horizontal stripes, that are, from the top to bottom: white, red, yellow, and blue. It was designed by Tadeusz Gajl, and adopted on 30 August 2002.

Design 
The flag of the Podlaskie Voivodeship is a rectangle, with an aspect ratio of height to width of 5:8, which is divided into four equal horizontal stripes, that are, from the top to bottom: white, red, yellow, and blue. The colours had been derived from the coat of arms of the voivodeship.

History 
The flag was designed by Tadeusz Gajl, and adopted by Podlaskie Regional Assembly on 30 August 2002, with the resolution no. LIV/448/02.

See also 
 coat of arms of the Podlaskie Voivodeship

References

Flag
Flags of voivodeships of Poland
Flags introduced in 2002
2002 establishments in Poland